

Africa

President – Abdelaziz Bouteflika, President of Algeria (1999–2019)
Prime Minister – Ali Benflis, Prime Minister of Algeria (2000–2003)

President – José Eduardo dos Santos, President of Angola (1979–2017)

President – Mathieu Kérékou, President of Benin (1996–2006)

President – Festus Mogae, President of Botswana (1998–2008)

President – Blaise Compaoré, President of Burkina Faso (1987–2014)
Prime Minister – Paramanga Ernest Yonli, Prime Minister of Burkina Faso (2000–2007)

President – Pierre Buyoya, President of Burundi (1996–2003)

President – Paul Biya, President of Cameroon (1982–present)
Prime Minister – Peter Mafany Musonge, Prime Minister of Cameroon (1996–2004)

President –
António Mascarenhas Monteiro, President of Cape Verde (1991–2001)
Pedro Pires, President of Cape Verde (2001–2011)
Prime Minister –
Gualberto do Rosário, Prime Minister of Cape Verde (2000–2001)
José Maria Neves, Prime Minister of Cape Verde (2001–2016)

President – Ange-Félix Patassé, President of the Central African Republic (1993–2003)
Prime Minister –
Anicet-Georges Dologuélé, Prime Minister of the Central African Republic (1999–2001)
Martin Ziguélé, Prime Minister of the Central African Republic (2001–2003)

President – Idriss Déby, President of Chad (1990–2021)
Prime Minister – Nagoum Yamassoum, Prime Minister of Chad (1999–2002)
 
President – Azali Assoumani, President of the Comoros (1999–2002)
Prime Minister – Hamada Madi, Prime Minister of the Comoros (2000–2002)
 (unrecognised, secessionist state)
President –
Said Abeid, President of Anjouan (1999–2001)
Presidium of Anjouan
Members – Halidi Charif, Mohamed Bacar, and Hassan Ali Toilha (2001)
Mohamed Bacar, President of Anjouan (2001–2007)

President – Denis Sassou Nguesso, President of the Republic of the Congo (1997–present)

President –
Laurent-Désiré Kabila, President of the Democratic Republic of the Congo (1997–2001)
Joseph Kabila, President of the Democratic Republic of the Congo (2001–2019)

President – Ismaïl Omar Guelleh, President of Djibouti (1999–present)
Prime Minister –
Barkat Gourad Hamadou, Prime Minister of Djibouti (1978–2001)
Dileita Mohamed Dileita, Prime Minister of Djibouti (2001–2013)

President – Hosni Mubarak, President of Egypt (1981–2011)
Prime Minister – Atef Ebeid, Prime Minister of Egypt (1999–2004)

President – Teodoro Obiang Nguema Mbasogo, President of Equatorial Guinea (1979–present)
Prime Minister –
Ángel Serafín Seriche Dougan, Prime Minister of Equatorial Guinea (1996–2001)
Cándido Muatetema Rivas, Prime Minister of Equatorial Guinea (2001–2004)

President – Isaias Afwerki, President of Eritrea (1991–present)

President –
Negasso Gidada, President of Ethiopia (1995–2001)
Girma Wolde-Giorgis, President of Ethiopia (2001–2013)
Prime Minister – Meles Zenawi, Prime Minister of Ethiopia (1995–2012)

President – Omar Bongo, President of Gabon (1967–2009)
Prime Minister – Jean-François Ntoutoume Emane, Prime Minister of Gabon (1999–2006)

President – Yahya Jammeh, President of the Gambia (1994–2017)

President –
Jerry Rawlings, President of Ghana (1981–2001)
John Kufuor, President of Ghana (2001–2009)

President – Lansana Conté, President of Guinea (1984–2008)
Prime Minister – Lamine Sidimé, Prime Minister of Guinea (1999–2004)

President – Kumba Ialá, President of Guinea-Bissau (2000–2003)
Prime Minister –
Caetano N'Tchama, Prime Minister of Guinea-Bissau (2000–2001)
Faustino Imbali, Prime Minister of Guinea-Bissau (2001)
Alamara Nhassé, Prime Minister of Guinea-Bissau (2001–2002)

President – Laurent Gbagbo, President of the Ivory Coast (2000–2011)
Prime Minister – Pascal Affi N'Guessan, Prime Minister of the Ivory Coast (2000–2003)

President – Daniel arap Moi, President of Kenya (1978–2002)

Monarch – Letsie III, King of Lesotho (1996–present)
Prime Minister – Pakalitha Mosisili, Prime Minister of Lesotho (1998–2012)

President – Charles Taylor, President of Liberia (2000–2003)

De facto Head of State – Muammar Gaddafi, Guide of the Revolution of Libya (1969–2011)
De jure Head of State – Muhammad az-Zanati, General Secretary of the General People's Congress of Libya (1992–2008)
Prime Minister – Imbarek Shamekh, General Secretary of the General People's Committee of Libya (2000–2003)

President – Didier Ratsiraka, President of Madagascar (1997–2002)
Prime Minister – Tantely Andrianarivo, Prime Minister of Madagascar (1998–2002)

President – Bakili Muluzi, President of Malawi (1994–2004)

President – Alpha Oumar Konaré, President of Mali (1992–2002)
Prime Minister – Mandé Sidibé, Prime Minister of Mali (2000–2002)

President – Maaouya Ould Sid'Ahmed Taya, President of Mauritania (1984–2005)
Prime Minister – Cheikh El Avia Ould Mohamed Khouna, Prime Minister of Mauritania (1998–2003)

President – Cassam Uteem, President of Mauritius (1992–2002)
Prime Minister – Sir Anerood Jugnauth, Prime Minister of Mauritius (2000–2003)
  (departmental collectivity of France)
redesignated from a territorial collectivity of the French Republic on 11 July
Prefect –
Pierre Bayle, Prefect of Mayotte (1998–2001)
Philippe de Mester, Prefect of Mayotte (2001–2002)
Head of Government – Younoussa Bamana, President of the General Council of Mayotte (1991–2004)

Monarch – Mohammed VI, King of Morocco (1999–present)
Prime Minister – Abderrahmane Youssoufi, Prime Minister of Morocco (1998–2002)
 (self-declared, partially recognised state)
President – Mohamed Abdelaziz, President of Western Sahara (1976–2016)
Prime Minister – Bouchraya Hammoudi Bayoun, Prime Minister of Western Sahara (1999–2003)

President – Joaquim Chissano, President of Mozambique (1986–2005)
Prime Minister – Pascoal Mocumbi, Prime Minister of Mozambique (1994–2004)

President – Sam Nujoma, President of Namibia (1990–2005)

President – Mamadou Tandja, President of Niger (1999–2010)
Prime Minister – Hama Amadou, Prime Minister of Niger (2000–2007)

President – Olusegun Obasanjo, President of Nigeria (1999–2007)
 
President – Paul Kagame, President of Rwanda (2000–present)
Prime Minister – Bernard Makuza, Prime Minister of Rwanda (2000–2011)
 (Dependent Territory of the United Kingdom)
Governor – David Hollamby, Governor of Saint Helena (1999–2004)

President –
Miguel Trovoada, President of São Tomé and Príncipe (1995–2001)
Fradique de Menezes, President of São Tomé and Príncipe (2001–2003)
Prime Minister –
Guilherme Posser da Costa, Prime Minister of São Tomé and Príncipe (1999–2002)
Evaristo Carvalho, Prime Minister of São Tomé and Príncipe (2001–2002)

President – Abdoulaye Wade, President of Senegal (2000–2012)
Prime Minister –
Moustapha Niasse, Prime Minister of Senegal (2000–2001)
Mame Madior Boye, Prime Minister of Senegal (2001–2002)

President – France-Albert René, President of Seychelles (1977–2004)

President – Ahmad Tejan Kabbah, President of Sierra Leone (1998–2007)

President – Abdiqasim Salad Hassan, President of Somalia (2000–2004)
Prime Minister –
Ali Khalif Galaydh, Prime Minister of Somalia (2000–2001)
Osman Jama Ali, Acting Prime Minister of Somalia (2001)
Hassan Abshir Farah, Prime Minister of Somalia (2001–2003)
 (unrecognised, secessionist state)
President – Muhammad Haji Ibrahim Egal, President of Somaliland (1993–2002)
 (self-declared autonomous state)
President –
Abdullahi Yusuf Ahmed, President of Puntland (1998–2001)
Yusuf Haji Nur, Acting President of Puntland (2001)
Jama Ali Jama, President of Puntland (2001–2002)

President – Thabo Mbeki, President of South Africa (1999–2008)

President – Omar al-Bashir, President of Sudan (1989–2019)

Monarch – Mswati III, King of Swaziland (1986–present)
Prime Minister – Barnabas Sibusiso Dlamini, Prime Minister of Swaziland (1996–2003)

President – Benjamin Mkapa, President of Tanzania (1995–2005)
Prime Minister – Frederick Sumaye, Prime Minister of Tanzania (1995–2005)

President – Gnassingbé Eyadéma, President of Togo (1967–2005)
Prime Minister – Agbéyomé Kodjo, Prime Minister of Togo (2000–2002)

President – Zine El Abidine Ben Ali, President of Tunisia (1987–2011)
Prime Minister – Mohamed Ghannouchi, Prime Minister of Tunisia (1999–2011)

President – Yoweri Museveni, President of Uganda (1986–present)
Prime Minister – Apolo Nsibambi, Prime Minister of Uganda (1999–2011)

President – Frederick Chiluba, President of Zambia (1991–2002)

President – Robert Mugabe, President of Zimbabwe (1987–2017)

Asia
Afghanistan

Supreme Leader – Mullah Omar, Supreme Leader of Afghanistan (1996–2001)
Prime Minister –
Mohammad Rabbani, Prime Minister of Afghanistan (1996–2001)
Abdul Kabir, Acting Prime Minister of Afghanistan (2001)

President –
Burhanuddin Rabbani, President of Afghanistan (1992–2001)
Hamid Karzai, Chairman of the Afghan Interim Administration (2001–2002)

Monarch – Sheikh Hamad bin Isa Al Khalifa, Emir of Bahrain (1999–present)
Prime Minister – Sheikh Khalifa bin Salman Al Khalifa, Prime Minister of Bahrain (1970–2020)

President –
Shahabuddin Ahmed, President of Bangladesh (1996–2001)
A. Q. M. Badruddoza Chowdhury, President of Bangladesh (2001–2002)
Prime Minister –
Sheikh Hasina, Prime Minister of Bangladesh (1996–2001)
Latifur Rahman, Chief Adviser of Bangladesh (2001)
Khaleda Zia, Prime Minister of Bangladesh (2001–2006)

Monarch – Jigme Singye Wangchuck, King of Bhutan (1972–2006)
Prime Minister –
Yeshey Zimba, Prime Minister of Bhutan (2000–2001)
Khandu Wangchuk, Prime Minister of Bhutan (2001–2002)

Monarch – Hassanal Bolkiah, Sultan of Brunei (1967–present)
Prime Minister – Hassanal Bolkiah, Prime Minister of Brunei (1984–present)

Monarch – Norodom Sihanouk, King of Cambodia (1993–2004)
Prime Minister – Hun Sen, Prime Minister of Cambodia (1985–present)

Communist Party Leader – Jiang Zemin, General Secretary of the Chinese Communist Party (1989–2002)
President – Jiang Zemin, President of China (1993–2003)
Premier – Zhu Rongji, Premier of the State Council of China (1998–2003)
 East Timor (under UN administration)
UN Special Representative – Sérgio Vieira de Mello, Special Representative of the UN Secretary-General for East Timor (1999–2002)
Chief Minister – Mari Alkatiri, Chief Minister of East Timor (2001–2006)

President – K. R. Narayanan, President of India (1997–2002)
Prime Minister – Atal Bihari Vajpayee, Prime Minister of India (1998–2004)

President –
Abdurrahman Wahid, President of Indonesia (1999–2001)
Megawati Sukarnoputri, President of Indonesia (2001–2004)

Supreme Leader – Ayatollah Ali Khamenei, Supreme Leader of Iran (1989–present)
President – Mohammad Khatami, President of Iran (1997–2005)

President – Saddam Hussein, President of Iraq (1979–2003)
Prime Minister – Saddam Hussein, Prime Minister of Iraq (1994–2003)

President – Moshe Katsav, President of Israel (2000–2007)
Prime Minister –
Ehud Barak, Prime Minister of Israel (1999–2001)
Ariel Sharon, Prime Minister of Israel (2001–2006)
 (non-state administrative authority)
President – Yasser Arafat, President of the Palestinian National Authority (1994–2004)

Monarch – Akihito, Emperor of Japan (1989–2019)
Prime Minister –
Yoshirō Mori, Prime Minister of Japan (2000–2001)
Junichirō Koizumi, Prime Minister of Japan (2001–2006)

Monarch – Abdullah II, King of Jordan (1999–present)
Prime Minister – Ali Abu al-Ragheb, Prime Minister of Jordan (2000–2003)

President – Nursultan Nazarbayev, President of Kazakhstan (1990–2019)
Prime Minister – Kassym-Jomart Tokayev, Prime Minister of Kazakhstan (1999–2002)

Communist Party Leader – Kim Jong-il, General Secretary of the Workers' Party of Korea (1997–2011)
De facto Head of State – Kim Jong-il, Chairman of the National Defence Commission of North Korea (1993–2011)
De jure Head of State – Kim Yong-nam, Chairman of the Presidium of the Supreme People's Assembly of North Korea (1998–2019)
Premier – Hong Song-nam, Premier of the Cabinet of North Korea (1997–2003)

President – Kim Dae-jung, President of South Korea (1998–2003)
Prime Minister – Lee Han-dong, Prime Minister of South Korea (2000–2002)

Monarch – Sheikh Jaber Al-Ahmad Al-Sabah, Emir of Kuwait (1977–2006)
Prime Minister – Sheikh Saad Al-Salim Al-Sabah, Prime Minister of Kuwait (1978–2003)

President – Askar Akayev, President of Kyrgyzstan (1990–2005)
Prime Minister – Kurmanbek Bakiyev, Prime Minister of Kyrgyzstan (2000–2002)

Communist Party Leader – Khamtai Siphandon, General Secretary of the Lao People's Revolutionary Party (1992–2006)
President – Khamtai Siphandon, President of Laos (1998–2006)
Premier –
Sisavath Keobounphanh, Chairman of the Council of Ministers of Laos (1998–2001)
Bounnhang Vorachith, Chairman of the Council of Ministers of Laos (2001–2006)

President – Émile Lahoud, President of Lebanon (1998–2007)
Prime Minister – Rafic Hariri, President of the Council of Ministers of Lebanon (2000–2004)

Monarch –
Tuanku Salahuddin, Yang di-Pertuan Agong of Malaysia (1999–2001)
Tuanku Mizan Zainal Abidin, Acting Yang di-Pertuan Agong of Malaysia (2001)
Tuanku Syed Sirajuddin, Yang di-Pertuan Agong of Malaysia (2001–2006)
Prime Minister – Mahathir Mohamad, Prime Minister of Malaysia (1981–2003)

President – Maumoon Abdul Gayoom, President of the Maldives (1978–2008)

President – Natsagiin Bagabandi, President of Mongolia (1997–2005)
Prime Minister – Nambaryn Enkhbayar, Prime Minister of Mongolia (2000–2004)

Head of State – Than Shwe, Chairman of the State Peace and Development Council of Myanmar (1992–2011)
Prime Minister – Than Shwe, Prime Minister of Myanmar (1992–2003)

Monarch –
Birendra, King of Nepal (1972–2001)
Dipendra, King of Nepal (2001)
Gyanendra, King of Nepal (2001–2008)
Regent – Gyanendra, Regent of Nepal (2001)
Prime Minister –
Girija Prasad Koirala, Prime Minister of Nepal (2000–2001)
Sher Bahadur Deuba, Prime Minister of Nepal (2001–2002)

Monarch – Qaboos bin Said al Said, Sultan of Oman (1970–2020)
Prime Minister – Qaboos bin Said al Said, Prime Minister of Oman (1972–2020)

President –
Muhammad Rafiq Tarar, President of Pakistan (1998–2001)
Pervez Musharraf, President of Pakistan (2001–2008)
Prime Minister – Pervez Musharraf, Chief Executive of Pakistan (1999–2002)

President –
Joseph Estrada, President of the Philippines (1998–2001)
Gloria Macapagal Arroyo, President of the Philippines (2001–2010)

Monarch – Sheikh Hamad bin Khalifa Al Thani, Emir of Qatar (1995–2013)
Prime Minister – Sheikh Abdullah bin Khalifa Al Thani, Prime Minister of Qatar (1996–2007)

Monarch – Fahd, King of Saudi Arabia (1982–2005)
Regent – Crown Prince Abdullah, Regent of Saudi Arabia (1996–2005)
Prime Minister – Fahd, Prime Minister of Saudi Arabia (1982–2005)

President – S. R. Nathan, President of Singapore (1999–2011)
Prime Minister – Goh Chok Tong, Prime Minister of Singapore (1990–2004)

President – Chandrika Kumaratunga, President of Sri Lanka (1994–2005)
Prime Minister –
Ratnasiri Wickremanayake, Prime Minister of Sri Lanka (2000–2001)
Ranil Wickremesinghe, Prime Minister of Sri Lanka (2001–2004)

President – Bashar al-Assad, President of Syria (2000–present)
Prime Minister – Muhammad Mustafa Mero, Prime Minister of Syria (2000–2003)

President – Chen Shui-bian, President of Taiwan (2000–2008)
Prime Minister – Chang Chun-hsiung, President of the Executive Yuan of Taiwan (2000–2002)

President – Emomali Rahmonov, President of Tajikistan (1992–present)
Prime Minister – Oqil Oqilov, Prime Minister of Tajikistan (1999–2013)

Monarch – Bhumibol Adulyadej, King of Thailand (1946–2016)
Prime Minister –
Chuan Leekpai, Prime Minister of Thailand (1997–2001)
Thaksin Shinawatra, Prime Minister of Thailand (2001–2006)

President – Ahmet Necdet Sezer, President of Turkey (2000–2007)
Prime Minister – Bülent Ecevit, Prime Minister of Turkey (1999–2002)
 
President – Saparmurat Niyazov, President of Turkmenistan (1990–2006)

President – Sheikh Zayed bin Sultan Al Nahyan, President of the United Arab Emirates (1976–2004)
Prime Minister – Sheikh Maktoum bin Rashid Al Maktoum, Prime Minister of the United Arab Emirates (1990–2006)

President – Islam Karimov, President of Uzbekistan (1990–2016)
Prime Minister – Oʻtkir Sultonov, Prime Minister of Uzbekistan (1995–2003)

Communist Party Leader –
Lê Khả Phiêu, General Secretary of the Communist Party of Vietnam (1997–2001)
Nông Đức Mạnh, General Secretary of the Communist Party of Vietnam (2001–2011)
President – Trần Đức Lương, President of Vietnam (1997–2006)
Prime Minister – Phan Văn Khải, Prime Minister of Vietnam (1997–2006)

President – Ali Abdullah Saleh, President of Yemen (1978–2012)
Prime Minister –
Abd Al-Karim Al-Iryani, Prime Minister of Yemen (1998–2001)
Abdul Qadir Bajamal, Prime Minister of Yemen (2001–2007)

Europe

President – Rexhep Meidani, President of Albania (1997–2002)
Prime Minister – Ilir Meta, Prime Minister of Albania (1999–2002)

Monarchs –
French Co-Prince – Jacques Chirac, French Co-prince of Andorra (1995–2007)
Co-Prince's Representative – Frédéric de Saint-Sernin (1999–2002)
Episcopal Co-Prince – Archbishop Joan Martí i Alanis, Episcopal Co-prince of Andorra (1971–2003)
Co-Prince's Representative – Nemesi Marqués Oste (1993–2012)
Prime Minister – Marc Forné Molné, Head of Government of Andorra (1994–2005)

President – Robert Kocharyan, President of Armenia (1998–2008)
Prime Minister – Andranik Margaryan, Prime Minister of Armenia (2000–2007)

President – Thomas Klestil, Federal President of Austria (1992–2004)
Chancellor – Wolfgang Schüssel, Federal Chancellor of Austria (2000–2007)

President – Heydar Aliyev, President of Azerbaijan (1993–2003)
Prime Minister – Artur Rasizade, Prime Minister of Azerbaijan (1996–2003)
 (unrecognised, secessionist state)
President – Arkadi Ghukasyan, President of Nagorno-Karabakh (1997–2007)
Prime Minister – Anushavan Danielyan, Prime Minister of Nagorno-Karabakh (1999–2007)

President – Alexander Lukashenko, President of Belarus (1994–present)
Prime Minister –
Vladimir Yermoshin, Prime Minister of Belarus (2000–2001)
Gennady Novitsky, Prime Minister of Belarus (2001–2003)

Monarch – Albert II, King of the Belgians (1993–2013)
Prime Minister – Guy Verhofstadt, Prime Minister of Belgium (1999–2008)

Head of State – Presidency of Bosnia and Herzegovina
Serb Member – Živko Radišić (1998–2002; Chairman of the Presidency of Bosnia and Herzegovina, 2000–2001)
Bosniak Member –
Halid Genjac (2000–2001)
Beriz Belkić (2001–2002)
Croat Member –
Ante Jelavić (1998–2001)
Jozo Križanović (2001–2002; Chairman of the Presidency of Bosnia and Herzegovina, 2001–2002)
Prime Minister –
Martin Raguž, Chairman of the Council of Ministers of Bosnia and Herzegovina (2000–2001)
Božidar Matić, Chairman of the Council of Ministers of Bosnia and Herzegovina (2001)
Zlatko Lagumdžija, Chairman of the Council of Ministers of Bosnia and Herzegovina (2001–2002)
High Representative – Wolfgang Petritsch, High Representative for Bosnia and Herzegovina (1999–2002)

President – Petar Stoyanov, President of Bulgaria (1997–2002)
Prime Minister –
Ivan Kostov, Prime Minister of Bulgaria (1997–2001)
Simeon Saxe-Coburg-Gotha, Prime Minister of Bulgaria (2001–2005)

President – Stjepan Mesić, President of Croatia (2000–2010)
Prime Minister – Ivica Račan, Prime Minister of Croatia (2000–2003)

President – Glafcos Clerides, President of Cyprus (1993–2003)
 (unrecognised, secessionist state)
President – Rauf Denktaş, President of Northern Cyprus (1976–2005)
Prime Minister – Derviş Eroğlu, Prime Minister of Northern Cyprus (1996–2004)

President – Václav Havel, President of the Czech Republic (1993–2003)
Prime Minister – Miloš Zeman, Prime Minister of the Czech Republic (1998–2002)

Monarch – Margrethe II, Queen of Denmark (1972–present)
Prime Minister –
Poul Nyrup Rasmussen, Prime Minister of Denmark (1993–2001)
Anders Fogh Rasmussen, Prime Minister of Denmark (2001–2009)

President –
Lennart Meri, President of Estonia (1992–2001)
Arnold Rüütel, President of Estonia (2001–2006)
Prime Minister – Mart Laar, Prime Minister of Estonia (1999–2002)

President – Tarja Halonen, President of Finland (2000–2012)
Prime Minister – Paavo Lipponen, Prime Minister of Finland (1995–2003)

President – Jacques Chirac, President of France (1995–2007)
Prime Minister – Lionel Jospin, Prime Minister of France (1997–2002)

President – Eduard Shevardnadze, President of Georgia (1995–2003)
Prime Minister –
Giorgi Arsenishvili, Minister of State of Georgia (2000–2001)
Avtandil Jorbenadze, Minister of State of Georgia (2001–2003)
 (unrecognised, secessionist state)
President – Vladislav Ardzinba, President of Abkhazia (1990–2005)
Prime Minister –
Viacheslav Tsugba, Prime Minister of Abkhazia (1999–2001)
Anri Jergenia, Prime Minister of Abkhazia (2001–2002)
 (unrecognised, secessionist state)
President –
Lyudvig Chibirov, President of South Ossetia (1993–2001)
Eduard Kokoity, President of South Ossetia (2001–2011)
Prime Minister –
Merab Chigoev, Prime Minister of South Ossetia (1998–2001)
Dmitry Sanakoyev, Prime Minister of South Ossetia (2001)
Gerasim Khugayev, Prime Minister of South Ossetia (2001–2003)

President – Johannes Rau, Federal President of Germany (1999–2004)
Chancellor – Gerhard Schröder, Federal Chancellor of Germany (1998–2005)

President – Konstantinos Stephanopoulos, President of Greece (1995–2005)
Prime Minister – Costas Simitis, Prime Minister of Greece (1996–2004)

President – Ferenc Mádl, President of Hungary (2000–2005)
Prime Minister – Viktor Orbán, Prime Minister of Hungary (1998–2002)

President – Ólafur Ragnar Grímsson, President of Iceland (1996–2016)
Prime Minister – Davíð Oddsson, Prime Minister of Iceland (1991–2004)

President – Mary McAleese, President of Ireland (1997–2011)
Prime Minister – Bertie Ahern, Taoiseach of Ireland (1997–2008)

President – Carlo Azeglio Ciampi, President of Italy (1999–2006)
Prime Minister –
Giuliano Amato, President of the Council of Ministers of Italy (2000–2001)
Silvio Berlusconi, President of the Council of Ministers of Italy (2001–2006)

President – Vaira Vīķe-Freiberga, President of Latvia (1999–2007)
Prime Minister – Andris Bērziņš, Prime Minister of Latvia (2000–2002)

Monarch – Hans-Adam II, Prince Regnant of Liechtenstein (1989–present)
Prime Minister –
Mario Frick, Head of Government of Liechtenstein (1993–2001)
Otmar Hasler, Head of Government of Liechtenstein (2001–2009)

President – Valdas Adamkus, President of Lithuania (1998–2003)
Prime Minister –
Rolandas Paksas, Prime Minister of Lithuania (2000–2001)
Eugenijus Gentvilas, Acting Prime Minister of Lithuania (2001)
Algirdas Brazauskas, Prime Minister of Lithuania (2001–2006)

Monarch – Henri, Grand Duke of Luxembourg (2000–present)
Prime Minister – Jean-Claude Juncker, Prime Minister of Luxembourg (1995–2013)

President – Boris Trajkovski, President of Macedonia (1999–2004)
Prime Minister – Ljubčo Georgievski, President of the Government of Macedonia (1998–2002)

President – Guido de Marco, President of Malta (1999–2004)
Prime Minister – Eddie Fenech Adami, Prime Minister of Malta (1998–2004)

President –
Petru Lucinschi, President of Moldova (1997–2001)
Vladimir Voronin, President of Moldova (2001–2009)
Prime Minister –
Dumitru Braghiș, Prime Minister of Moldova (1999–2001)
Vasile Tarlev, Prime Minister of Moldova (2001–2008)
 (unrecognised, secessionist state)
President – Igor Smirnov, President of Transnistria (1990–2011)

Monarch – Rainier III, Sovereign Prince of Monaco (1949–2005)
Prime Minister – Patrick Leclercq, Minister of State of Monaco (2000–2005)

Monarch – Beatrix, Queen of the Netherlands (1980–2013)
 (constituent country of the Kingdom of the Netherlands)
Prime Minister – Wim Kok, Prime Minister of the Netherlands (1994–2002)
 (constituent country of the Kingdom of the Netherlands)
see 
 (constituent country of the Kingdom of the Netherlands)
see 

Monarch – Harald V, King of Norway (1991–present)
Prime Minister –
Jens Stoltenberg, Prime Minister of Norway (2000–2001)
Kjell Magne Bondevik, Prime Minister of Norway (2001–2005)

President – Aleksander Kwaśniewski, President of Poland (1995–2005)
Prime Minister –
Jerzy Buzek, Chairman of the Council of Ministers of Poland (1997–2001)
Leszek Miller, Chairman of the Council of Ministers of Poland (2001–2004)

President – Jorge Sampaio, President of Portugal (1996–2006)
Prime Minister – António Guterres, Prime Minister of Portugal (1995–2002)

President – Ion Iliescu, President of Romania (2000–2004)
Prime Minister – Adrian Năstase, Prime Minister of Romania (2000–2004)

President – Vladimir Putin, President of Russia (1999–2008)
Prime Minister – Mikhail Kasyanov, Chairman of the Government of Russia (2000–2004)

Captains-Regent –
Gianfranco Terenzi and Enzo Colombini, Captains Regent of San Marino (2000–2001)
Luigi Lonfernini and Fabio Berardi, Captains Regent of San Marino (2001)
Alberto Cecchetti and Gino Giovagnoli, Captains Regent of San Marino (2001–2002)

President – Rudolf Schuster, President of Slovakia (1999–2004)
Prime Minister – Mikuláš Dzurinda, Prime Minister of Slovakia (1998–2006)

President – Milan Kučan, President of Slovenia (1990–2002)
Prime Minister – Janez Drnovšek, Prime Minister of Slovenia (2000–2002)

Monarch – Juan Carlos I, King of Spain (1975–2014)
Prime Minister – José María Aznar, President of the Government of Spain (1996–2004)

Monarch – Carl XVI Gustaf, King of Sweden (1973–present)
Prime Minister – Göran Persson, Prime Minister of Sweden (1996–2006)

Council – Federal Council of Switzerland
Members – Kaspar Villiger (1989–2003), Ruth Dreifuss (1993–2002), Moritz Leuenberger (1995–2010; President of Switzerland, 2001), Pascal Couchepin (1998–2009), Ruth Metzler (1999–2003), Joseph Deiss (1999–2006), and Samuel Schmid (2000–2008)

President – Leonid Kuchma, President of Ukraine (1994–2005)
Prime Minister –
Viktor Yushchenko, Prime Minister of Ukraine (1999–2001)
Anatoliy Kinakh, Prime Minister of Ukraine (2001–2002)

Monarch – Elizabeth II, Queen of the United Kingdom (1952–2022)
Prime Minister – Tony Blair, Prime Minister of the United Kingdom (1997–2007)
 (Crown dependency of the United Kingdom)
Lieutenant-Governor – Ian Macfadyen, Lieutenant Governor of the Isle of Man (2000–2005)
Chief Minister –
Donald Gelling, Chief Minister of the Isle of Man (1996–2001)
Richard Corkill, Chief Minister of the Isle of Man (2001–2004)
 (Crown dependency of the United Kingdom)
Lieutenant-Governor – Sir John Foley, Lieutenant Governor of Guernsey (2000–2005)
Bailiff – de Vic Carey, Bailiff of Guernsey (1999–2005)
 (Crown dependency of the United Kingdom)
Lieutenant-Governor –
Sir Michael Wilkes, Lieutenant Governor of Jersey (1995–2001)
Sir John Cheshire, Lieutenant Governor of Jersey (2001–2006)
Bailiff – Sir Philip Bailhache, Bailiff of Jersey (1995–2009)
 (Dependent Territory of the United Kingdom)
Governor – David Durie, Governor of Gibraltar (2000–2003)
Chief Minister – Peter Caruana, Chief Minister of Gibraltar (1996–2011)

Monarch – Pope John Paul II, Sovereign of Vatican City (1978–2005)
Head of Government – Cardinal Edmund Szoka, President of the Governorate of Vatican City (1997–2006)
Holy See (sui generis subject of public international law)
Secretary of State – Cardinal Angelo Sodano, Cardinal Secretary of State (1990–2006)

President – Vojislav Koštunica, President of Yugoslavia (2000–2003)
Prime Minister –
Zoran Žižić, Prime Minister of Yugoslavia (2000–2001)
Dragiša Pešić, Prime Minister of Yugoslavia (2001–2003)
Kosovo (Self-Governing Entity under UN administration)
UN Special Representative –
Bernard Kouchner, Special Representative of the UN Secretary-General for Kosovo (1999–2001)
Hans Hækkerup, Special Representative of the UN Secretary-General for Kosovo (2001)

North America
 (Dependent Territory of the United Kingdom)
Governor – Peter Johnstone, Governor of Anguilla (2000–2004)
Chief Minister – Osbourne Fleming, Chief Minister of Anguilla (2000–2010)

Monarch – Elizabeth II, Queen of Antigua and Barbuda (1981–2022)
Governor-General – Sir James Carlisle, Governor-General of Antigua and Barbuda (1993–2007)
Prime Minister – Lester Bird, Prime Minister of Antigua and Barbuda (1994–2004)
 (constituent country of the Kingdom of the Netherlands)
Governor – Olindo Koolman, Governor of Aruba (1992–2004)
Prime Minister –
Henny Eman, Prime Minister of Aruba (1994–2001)
Nelson Oduber, Prime Minister of Aruba (2001–2009)

Monarch – Elizabeth II, Queen of the Bahamas (1973–2022)
Governor-General –
Sir Orville Turnquest, Governor-General of the Bahamas (1995–2001)
Dame Ivy Dumont, Governor-General of the Bahamas (2001–2005)
Prime Minister – Hubert Ingraham, Prime Minister of the Bahamas (1992–2002)

Monarch – Elizabeth II, Queen of Barbados (1966–2021)
Governor-General – Sir Clifford Husbands, Governor-General of Barbados (1996–2011)
Prime Minister – Owen Arthur, Prime Minister of Barbados (1994–2008)

Monarch – Elizabeth II, Queen of Belize (1981–2022)
Governor-General – Sir Colville Young, Governor-General of Belize (1993–2021)
Prime Minister – Said Musa, Prime Minister of Belize (1998–2008)
 (Dependent Territory of the United Kingdom)
Governor –
Thorold Masefield, Governor of Bermuda (1997–2001)
Tim Gurney, Acting Governor of Bermuda (2001–2002)
Premier – Jennifer M. Smith, Premier of Bermuda (1998–2003)
 (Dependent Territory of the United Kingdom)
Governor – Frank Savage, Governor of the British Virgin Islands (1998–2002)
Chief Minister – Ralph T. O'Neal, Chief Minister of the British Virgin Islands (1995–2003)

Monarch – Elizabeth II, Queen of Canada (1952–2022)
Governor-General – Adrienne Clarkson, Governor General of Canada (1999–2005)
Prime Minister – Jean Chrétien, Prime Minister of Canada (1993–2003)
 (Dependent Territory of the United Kingdom)
Governor – Peter Smith, Governor of the Cayman Islands (1999–2002)
Head of Government –
Kurt Tibbetts, Leader of Government Business of the Cayman Islands (2000–2001)
McKeeva Bush, Leader of Government Business of the Cayman Islands (2001–2005)

President – Miguel Ángel Rodríguez, President of Costa Rica (1998–2002)

Communist Party Leader – Fidel Castro, First Secretary of the Communist Party of Cuba (1965–2011)
President – Fidel Castro, President of the Council of State of Cuba (1976–2008)
Prime Minister – Fidel Castro, President of the Council of Ministers of Cuba (1959–2008)

President – Vernon Shaw, President of Dominica (1998–2003)
Prime Minister – Pierre Charles, Prime Minister of Dominica (2000–2004)

President – Hipólito Mejía, President of the Dominican Republic (2000–2004)

President – Francisco Flores Pérez, President of El Salvador (1999–2004)

Monarch – Elizabeth II, Queen of Grenada (1974–2022)
Governor-General – Sir Daniel Williams, Governor-General of Grenada (1996–2008)
Prime Minister – Keith Mitchell, Prime Minister of Grenada (1995–2008)

President – Alfonso Portillo, President of Guatemala (2000–2004)

President –
René Préval, President of Haiti (1996–2001)
Jean-Bertrand Aristide, President of Haiti (2001–2004)
Prime Minister –
Jacques-Édouard Alexis, Prime Minister of Haiti (1999–2001)
Jean Marie Chérestal, Prime Minister of Haiti (2001–2002)

President – Carlos Roberto Flores, President of Honduras (1998–2002)

Monarch – Elizabeth II, Queen of Jamaica (1962–2022)
Governor-General – Sir Howard Cooke, Governor-General of Jamaica (1991–2006)
Prime Minister – P. J. Patterson, Prime Minister of Jamaica (1992–2006)

President – Vicente Fox, President of Mexico (2000–2006)
 (Dependent Territory of the United Kingdom)
Governor –
Tony Abbott, Governor of Montserrat (1997–2001)
Howard Fergus, Acting Governor of Montserrat (2001)
Tony Longrigg, Governor of Montserrat (2001–2004)
Chief Minister –
David Brandt, Chief Minister of Montserrat (1997–2001)
John Osborne, Chief Minister of Montserrat (2001–2006)
 (constituent country of the Kingdom of the Netherlands)
Governor – Jaime Saleh, Governor of the Netherlands Antilles (1990–2002)
Prime Minister – Miguel Arcangel Pourier, Prime Minister of the Netherlands Antilles (1999–2002)

President – Arnoldo Alemán, President of Nicaragua (1997–2002)

President – Mireya Moscoso, President of Panama (1999–2004)

Monarch – Elizabeth II, Queen of Saint Kitts and Nevis (1983–2022)
Governor-General – Sir Cuthbert Sebastian, Governor-General of Saint Kitts and Nevis (1996–2013)
Prime Minister – Denzil Douglas, Prime Minister of Saint Kitts and Nevis (1995–2015)

Monarch – Elizabeth II, Queen of Saint Lucia (1979–2022)
Governor-General – Dame Pearlette Louisy, Governor-General of Saint Lucia (1997–2017)
Prime Minister – Kenny Anthony, Prime Minister of Saint Lucia (1997–2006)
  (departmental collectivity of France)
redesignated from a territorial collectivity of the French Republic on 11 July
Prefect –
Francis Spitzer, Prefect of Saint Pierre and Miquelon (1999–2001)
Jean-François Tallec, Prefect of Saint Pierre and Miquelon (2001–2002)
Head of Government – Marc Plantegenest, President of the General Council of Saint Pierre and Miquelon (2000–2005)

Monarch – Elizabeth II, Queen of Saint Vincent and the Grenadines (1979–2022)
Governor-General – Sir Charles Antrobus, Governor-General of Saint Vincent and the Grenadines (1996–2002)
Prime Minister –
Arnhim Eustace, Prime Minister of Saint Vincent and the Grenadines (2000–2001)
Ralph Gonsalves, Prime Minister of Saint Vincent and the Grenadines (2001–present)

President – A. N. R. Robinson, President of Trinidad and Tobago (1997–2003)
Prime Minister –
Basdeo Panday, Prime Minister of Trinidad and Tobago (1995–2001)
Patrick Manning, Prime Minister of Trinidad and Tobago (2001–2010)
 (Dependent Territory of the United Kingdom)
Governor – Mervyn Jones, Governor of the Turks and Caicos Islands (2000–2002)
Chief Minister – Derek Hugh Taylor, Chief Minister of the Turks and Caicos Islands (1995–2003)

President –
Bill Clinton, President of the United States (1993–2001)
George W. Bush, President of the United States (2001–2009)
 (Commonwealth of the United States)
Governor –
Pedro Rosselló, Governor of Puerto Rico (1993–2001)
Sila María Calderón, Governor of Puerto Rico (2001–2005)
 (insular area of the United States)
Governor – Charles Wesley Turnbull, Governor of the United States Virgin Islands (1999–2007)

Oceania
 (unorganised, unincorporated territory of the United States)
Governor – Tauese Sunia, Governor of American Samoa (1997–2003)

Monarch – Elizabeth II, Queen of Australia (1952–2022)
Governor-General –
Sir William Deane, Governor-General of Australia (1996–2001)
Peter Hollingworth, Governor-General of Australia (2001–2003)
Prime Minister – John Howard, Prime Minister of Australia (1996–2007)
Christmas Island (external territory of Australia)
Administrator – Bill Taylor, Administrator of Christmas Island (1999–2003)
Shire-President –
Dave McLane, Shire president of Christmas Island (1998–2001)
Andrew Smolders, Shire president of Christmas Island (2001–2003)
Cocos (Keeling) Islands (external territory of Australia)
Administrator – Bill Taylor, Administrator of the Cocos (Keeling) Islands (1999–2003)
Shire-President –
Mohammad Said Chongkin, Shire president of the Cocos (Keeling) Islands (1999–2001)
Ronald Grant, Shire president of the Cocos (Keeling) Islands (2001–2007)
 (self-governing territory of Australia)
Administrator – Tony Messner, Administrator of Norfolk Island (1997–2003)
Chief Minister –
Ronald Coane Nobbs, Chief Minister of Norfolk Island (2000–2001)
Geoffrey Robert Gardner, Chief Minister of Norfolk Island (2001–2006)

President – Ratu Josefa Iloilo, President of Fiji (2000–2006)
Prime Minister –
Laisenia Qarase, Prime Minister of Fiji (2000–2001)
Ratu Tevita Momoedonu, Prime Minister of Fiji (2001)
Laisenia Qarase, Prime Minister of Fiji (2001–2006)
  (overseas territory of France)
High Commissioner –
Jean Aribaud, High Commissioner of the Republic in French Polynesia (1997–2001)
Christian Massinon, Acting High Commissioner of the Republic in French Polynesia (2001)
Michel Mathieu, High Commissioner of the Republic in French Polynesia (2001–2005)
Head of Government – Gaston Flosse, President of the Government of French Polynesia (1991–2004)
 (insular area of the United States)
Governor – Carl Gutierrez, Governor of Guam (1995–2003)

President – Teburoro Tito, President of Kiribati (1994–2003)

President – Kessai Note, President of the Marshall Islands (2000–2008)

President – Leo Falcam, President of Micronesia (1999–2003)

President –
Bernard Dowiyogo, President of Nauru (2000–2001)
René Harris, President of Nauru (2001–2003)
 (sui generis collectivity of France)
High Commissioner – Thierry Lataste, High Commissioner of New Caledonia (1999–2002)
Head of Government –
Jean Lèques, President of the Government of New Caledonia (1999–2001)
Pierre Frogier, President of the Government of New Caledonia (2001–2004)

Monarch – Elizabeth II, Queen of New Zealand (1952–2022)
Governor-General –
Sir Michael Hardie Boys, Governor-General of New Zealand (1996–2001)
Dame Sian Elias, Administrator of the Government of New Zealand (2001)
Dame Silvia Cartwright, Governor-General of New Zealand (2001–2006)
Prime Minister – Helen Clark, Prime Minister of New Zealand (1999–2008)
 (associated state of New Zealand)
Queen's Representative –
Lawrence Murray Greig, Acting Queen's Representative of the Cook Islands (2000–2001)
Frederick Tutu Goodwin, Queen's Representative of the Cook Islands (2001–2013)
Prime Minister – Terepai Maoate, Prime Minister of the Cook Islands (1999–2002)
 (associated state of New Zealand)
Premier – Sani Lakatani, Premier of Niue (1999–2002)
Tokelau (dependent territory of New Zealand)
Administrator – Lindsay Johnstone Watt, Administrator of Tokelau (1993–2003)
Head of Government –
Kolouei O'Brien, Head of Government of Tokelau (2000–2001)
Kuresa Nasau, Head of Government of Tokelau (2001–2002)
 (Commonwealth of the United States)
Governor – Pedro Tenorio, Governor of the Northern Mariana Islands (1998–2002)

President –
Kuniwo Nakamura, President of Palau (1993–2001)
Tommy Remengesau, President of Palau (2001–2009)

Monarch – Elizabeth II, Queen of Papua New Guinea (1975–2022)
Governor-General – Sir Silas Atopare, Governor-General of Papua New Guinea (1997–2003)
Prime Minister – Sir Mekere Morauta, Prime Minister of Papua New Guinea (1999–2002)
 (Dependent Territory of the United Kingdom)
Governor –
Martin Williams, Governor of the Pitcairn Islands (1998–2001)
Richard Fell, Governor of the Pitcairn Islands (2001–2006)
Mayor – Steve Christian, Mayor of the Pitcairn Islands (1999–2004)

Head of State – Malietoa Tanumafili II, O le Ao o le Malo of Samoa (1962–2007)
Prime Minister – Tuila'epa Sa'ilele Malielegaoi, Prime Minister of Samoa (1998–2021)

Monarch – Elizabeth II, Queen of the Solomon Islands (1978–2022)
Governor-General – Sir John Lapli, Governor-General of the Solomon Islands (1999–2004)
Prime Minister –
Manasseh Sogavare, Prime Minister of the Solomon Islands (2000–2001)
Sir Allan Kemakeza, Prime Minister of the Solomon Islands (2001–2006)

Monarch – Tāufaʻāhau Tupou IV, King of Tonga (1965–2006)
Prime Minister – Prince Lavaka Ata ʻUlukālala, Prime Minister of Tonga (2000–2006)

Monarch – Elizabeth II, Queen of Tuvalu (1978–2022)
Governor-General – Sir Tomasi Puapua, Governor-General of Tuvalu (1998–2003)
Prime Minister –
Lagitupu Tuilimu, Acting Prime Minister of Tuvalu (2000–2001)
Faimalaga Luka, Prime Minister of Tuvalu (2001)
Koloa Talake, Prime Minister of Tuvalu (2001–2002)

President – John Bani, President of Vanuatu (1999–2004)
Prime Minister –
Barak Sopé, Prime Minister of Vanuatu (1999–2001)
Edward Natapei, Prime Minister of Vanuatu (2001–2004)
  (overseas territory of France)
Administrator – Alain Waquet, Administrator Superior of Wallis and Futuna (2000–2002)
Head of Government –
Soane Mani Uhila, President of the Territorial Assembly of Wallis and Futuna (1999–2001)
Patalione Kanimoa, President of the Territorial Assembly of Wallis and Futuna (2001–2005)

South America

President –
Fernando de la Rúa, President of Argentina (1999–2001)
Ramón Puerta, Acting President of Argentina (2001)
Adolfo Rodríguez Saá, President of Argentina (2001)
Eduardo Camaño, Acting President of Argentina (2001–2002)

President –
Hugo Banzer, President of Bolivia (1997–2001)
Jorge Quiroga, President of Bolivia (2001–2002)

President – Fernando Henrique Cardoso, President of Brazil (1995–2002)

President – Ricardo Lagos, President of Chile (2000–2006)

President – Andrés Pastrana Arango, President of Colombia (1998–2002)

President – Gustavo Noboa, President of Ecuador (2000–2003)
 (Dependent Territory of the United Kingdom)
Governor – Donald Lamont, Governor of the Falkland Islands (1999–2002)
Chief Executive – Michael Blanch, Chief Executive of the Falkland Islands (2000–2003)

President – Bharrat Jagdeo, President of Guyana (1999–2011)
Prime Minister – Sam Hinds, Prime Minister of Guyana (1999–2015)

President – Luis Ángel González Macchi, President of Paraguay (1999–2003)

President –
Valentín Paniagua, President of Peru (2000–2001)
Alejandro Toledo, President of Peru (2001–2006)
Prime Minister –
Javier Pérez de Cuéllar, President of the Council of Ministers of Peru (2000–2001)
Roberto Dañino, President of the Council of Ministers of Peru (2001–2002)

President – Ronald Venetiaan, President of Suriname (2000–2010)

President – Jorge Batlle Ibáñez, President of Uruguay (2000–2005)

President – Hugo Chávez, President of Venezuela (1999–2002)

Notes

External links
Rulersa list of rulers throughout time and places
WorldStatesmenan online encyclopedia of the leaders of nations and territories

State leaders
State leaders
State leaders
2001